Treyford to Bepton Down is a  biological Site of Special Scientific Interest south-west of Midhurst in West Sussex.

This site consists of five separate blocks of steeply sloping chalk grassland and yew woodland on the South Downs. The grassland has a rich variety of species, including herbs such as round-headed rampion, horseshoe vetch and carline thistle, while there are orchids such as frog, bee and musk. The uncommon moss Rhacomitrium lanuginosum has also been recorded.

References

Sites of Special Scientific Interest in West Sussex